Shadow Lake is a lake in the city of Kawartha Lakes in Central Ontario, Canada.

Geography

The primary inflow is the Gull River, at the northwest and arriving from the community of Norland, which accounts for 98% of the  inflow into the lake. There are three unnamed secondary inflows. The primary outflow, at the south, is also the Gull River, which flows south through two rapids, known locally as "the chute", to Silver Lake. It continues to the mouth of the Gull River at Balsam Lake, and then via the main Kawartha Lakes chain, the Otonabee River and the Trent River to the Bay of Quinte on Lake Ontario.

Recreation
Boating is possible upstream to a dam at Norland; and downstream through Silver Lake to a dam at the community of Coboconk, though low and high water flow situations can make the latter passage hazardous.

See also
List of lakes in Ontario

References

Footnotes

Sources

Lakes of Kawartha Lakes